Syed Afzal Ali (born 1834) was a famous personality from Bulandshahr. Four of his sons were bestowed with the title of Khan Bahadur by British India, a rare distinction in a family of Indian history.

Family history

Syed Afzal Ali was the son of Syed Ghulam Ali bin Ghulam Mustafa bin Syed Mohammad Arshad bin Syed Nematullah bin Syed Kamal Mohammad bin Mohammad Amin bin Syed Pir Mohammad bin Syed Ali Mohammad bin Syed Mohammad Ismail.

Syed Mohammad Ismail (descendant of Imam Ja'far al-Sadiq came to Kasna, District Bulandshahr from Sabzwar (Afghanistan)

Syed Ghulam Ali was married in Palwal to Jamiatun Nisan, daughter of Mohammad Hasan Ali aka Ghulam Hasan (bin Kamaluddin bin Saifuddin bin Nurullah bin Shaikh Nurul Haq bin Shaikh Abdul-Haqq Dehlavi

Legacy and children
Syed Afzal Ali was married to Imtiazi Begum, daughter of Iradat Ali of Pinangwan and had nine sons: Habib ul Ambia, Syed Misbahul Usman, Syed Ali Hasan, Syed Iqbal Hasan, Syed Mohammad Farooq (He was not the son of Syed Afzal Ali), Syed Aal Hasan, Syed Mohmmad Siddiq, Syed Riyazul Hasan, Syed Ziaul Hasan and Syed Mohammad Omar. They were all in good positions during the British rule in India.
 AqqKhan Bahadur Syed Misbahul Usman did Matriculation with first division from Etawah. Sir Syed Ahmad Khan brought him to Aligarh from where he did BA. In 1911, he became the trustee member of the Old Boys’ Association of Aligarh. In 1929, he was knighted with the title of Khan Bahadur by British India. He became Deputy Commissioner of the state United Provinces of Agra and Oudh and died on 20 April 1938. He was married to the daughter of Yaqub Ali ibn Tahawar Ali and had one son, Akhtar Afzal.
 Syed Ali Hasan completed his BA from Muhammadan Anglo-Oriental College in 1902. He was a good cricket player and remained the captain of the Muhammadan Anglo-Oriental College Cricket team for three consecutive years. In his captaincy, he promoted the club and also wrote a book on cricket, which could not be published. In 1903, when the team of MCC visited Aligarh, he was selected for the team although he had left Aligarh and played from MAO College. The team won the match. He became the Superintendent of Police (India) and then Deputy Inspector General of Police. He retired from Farrukhabad. After retirement, he was reemployed and appointed as Inspector-General of Police in Gwalior. In 1930, he was knighted with the title of Khan Bahadur by British India. He died in 1962 at Lucknow.
 Khan Bahadur Syed Iqbal Hasan joined the Indian Police Service in the state of Madhya Pradesh shortly after his graduation.  He rose through the ranks gaining accolades for capturing India's most wanted outlaws. In acknowledgement of his achievements, he was bestowed the title of Khan Sahib in 1934. At the time of his retirement in 1943, he held the position of Superintendent of Police in Jabalpur.  Following his retirement from the Government he was appointed as the Chief Administrative Officer of the Indian Ordnance Factories Service. In January 1945, he was knighted with the title of Khan Bahadur by British India. He died in June 1945 in Hyderabad State at the age of 62.
 Syed Mohammad Farooq was City Magistrate at Bhopal. In 1929, he was knighted with the title of Khan Bahadur by British India 》》Syed Muhammad Farooq is not the son of Syed Afzal Ali. 9x Sons are completed with the addition of Habib ul Ambia above. 
 Aal Hasan did BA from MAO College in 1911. In Nagpur, he remained "Extra Assistant Commissioner" which was an equivalent post of 'Deputy Collector'. He died due to heart attack in 1937.
 Mohammad Siddiq was "Nazir" means "Keeper". He had two sons Sufi Reyazul Mustafa and Dr. Sirajul Mustafa (died on 7 December 1958 at Rahim Yar Khan, Pakistan).
 Hafiz Riyazul Hasan (born 1889) was the "District and Session Judge" and retired from Aligarh. He was the alumnus of Muhammadan Anglo-Oriental College and also remained Secretary of the Old Boys’ Association of Aligarh. Like his father, he was also married in Pinangwan with the daughter of Mobarak Ali ibn Karamat Ali (Zamin Ali). Karamat Ali who was also the brother of Iradat Ali, got hid due to taking part in 1857 revolt and then finally became the Collector (Nazim) at Jhalawar State. He had one son who died in World War II. In 1972, he migrated to Pakistan and died there in the city Karachi on 17 February 1977.
 Ziaul Hasan was ‘Ticket Collector’ and was also the alumnus of Muhammadan Anglo-Oriental College.
 Syed Mohammad Omar was first served as ‘Inspector Customs’ (Customs officer) and then Tehsildar at Bhopal. In 1925, he was employed as Magistrate city Bhopal and retired from that post in 1930. I930 he was reemployed as ‘’Dewan-i Riyasat" of Ganj Basoda. In 1929, he was knighted with the title of Khan Bahadur by British India. Because of able administrationship, he got respect and honour. He was fond of Hunting and hunted many animals from Fish to Lion. Syed Mohammad Omar Syed Mohammad Omar died on 10 March 1951 and was married to Sharifun Nisan, daughter of Qazi Hameeduddin ibn Fariduddin of Ginnor (Rohtak). Pir Hameeduddin was a famous scholar and sufi from the order of Naqshbandi. Syed Mohammad Omar had four daughters Umme Hani (married to Nasirul Haq, Sub Judge at Bhopal and editor of Madina), Aziz Fatima (married to Mushtaqul Mustafa), Mushtaq Fatima ( married to Syed Ahsan Ali) Anis Fatima and two sons Mohammad Yunus and Mohammad Yusuf. Mohammad Yunus was Honorary Magistrate at Bhopal and was married to his cousin Alia Begum (daughter of Khan Bahadur Syed Misbahul Usman) while younger brother Mohammad Yusuf was Income Tax Officer at Jabalpur and Bhopal and was also married to his cousin Aisha Begum (daughter of Khan Bahadur Syed Ali Hasan).

 All these brothers studied at Muhammadan Anglo-Oriental College, Aligarh and were very active in the interest of Aligarh Muslim University (AMU). They also formed a branch of AMU Old Boys Association at Bulandshahr.

See also 
Tahawar Ali
Qazi Syed Inayatullah
Qazi Syed Hayatullah
Munshi Hakimuddin
Hafiz Mazhar Husain

References 

People from Bulandshahr
People from Tijara
Indian Muslims
Aligarh Muslim University alumni
1834 births
Year of death unknown